The 2013–14 season was FC Ararat Yerevan's  23rd consecutive season in the Armenian Premier League. Ararat finished the season in 4th position, missing out on European football by 3points. In the Armenian Cup they were knocked out by Pyunik in the Quarterfinals.

Season events
Prior to the start of the season, Ararat traveled to Serbia for a training camp and three friendly games, with new signing Miloš Stamenković joining the club during the trip. During the training camp, Ararat signed Darko Bondzić and Aleksandar Rakić, and national team goalkeeper Stepan Ghazaryan.

On 2 August 2013, Ararat signed Aram Bareghamyan from Ulisses on a contract until May 2014.

On 9 December 2013, Ararat parted was with Arsen Petrosyan and Hovhannes Grigoryan, whilst Tigran Voskanyan extended his contract with the club until May 2014.

In January 2014, Ararat traveled to Cyprus for a training camp.

In February, Ararat signed Andrejs Perepļotkins from Daugava Riga, Aleksandr Dubõkin from Jõhvi Lokomotiv, Eduard Chudnowski from BATE Borisov and Kenan Čejvanović from Gorica on contracts until the end of the season.

Whilst Alexandru Pașcenco signed a 3.5-year contract with Ararat on 21 February from Sheriff Tiraspol.

Squad

Transfers

In

Loans in

Released

Friendlies

Competitions

Premier League

Results summary

Results by round

Results

Table

Armenian Cup

Statistics

Appearances and goals

|-
|colspan="14"|Players who left Ararat Yerevan during the season:

|}

Goal scorers

Clean sheets

Disciplinary Record

References

FC Ararat Yerevan seasons
Ararat Yerevan